Oenothera suffulta, known as roadside gaura, honeysuckle gaura, or kisses, is a flowering plant in the primrose family, Onagraceae. It is endemic to the United States, in Texas (excluding the Trans-Pecos) and southern Oklahoma.

Taxonomy
Roadside gaura was first formally named in 1850 as Gaura suffulta. It was transferred to the genus Oenothera in 2007.

It is most closely related to Oenothera patriciae and Oenothera triangulata.

Description
Oenothera suffulta is an annual herb, of open, sandy places. The lower leaf surface is softly, velvety hairy.

Roadside gaura flowers from April to June. Each plant produces a spike of closely packed flowers; several flowers open each day, around sunset. The flowers are relatively scentless. The fruit is a woody, indehiscent capsule with broad wings on the angles.

References

suffulta
Flora of Oklahoma
Flora of Texas
Flora without expected TNC conservation status